Muhammad Mahmoud Al-Zubairi (1910 – 1 April 1965) was a Yemeni poet, politician, and revolutionary. He is considered to be Yemen's greatest poet in the twentieth century and one of the country's most celebrated authors. He has been known as "Abu Al-Ahrar (the father of freemen) and "the poet of Yemen".

Biography 
Muhammad was born in 1910 in Sanaa in a middle-class family and grew up as an orphan. He studied his basic education at Sanaa religious schools and in 1939 he moved to Cairo to continue his higher education at Cairo University. He returned to Sanaa in 1941, but he was imprisoned by Imam Yahya as he criticized and opposed the Imamate. He was released a year later and moved to Taiz and then to Aden and established a political party "Liberal Party" in 1944. Following the Dustor or Constitutional Revolution in 1948 that led to the death of Imam Yahya and the establishment of a new government, Muhammad returned to Sanaa and was appointed as Minister of Knowledge. However, the revolution failed weeks later as Imam Yahy's son Ahmed restored the monarchy, and Al-Zubairi had to leave Sanaa to Aden again and then to Pakistan. When the 26 September Revolution erupted against Imam Ahmed in 1962, he went back to the country and hold the position of Minister of Education. He was later appointed as Deputy Prime Minister and a member of the Revolutionary Council until he quit in 1964. On 1 April 1965 he was assassinated in Barat northern Sana'a.

Bibliography

Non-fiction 

 Imamate and Its Danger to Unity of Yemen
 The Great Trick in Arab Politics

Famous poetry collections 

 Poetry Revolution, 1963
 Prayer in Hell, 1960
 Diwan Al-Zubairi, 1978

Novels 

 Ma'asat Waq Alwaq,1985

References 

1910 births
People from Sanaa
20th-century Yemeni politicians
20th-century Yemeni poets
20th-century Yemeni educators
20th-century Yemeni novelists
Yemeni revolutionaries
1965 deaths
Assassinated Yemeni politicians
Cairo University alumni
20th-century Yemeni writers